Heinrich Theodor von Schön (20 January 1773 – 23 July 1856) was a Prussian statesman who assisted in the liberal reforms in Prussia during the Napoleonic Wars.

Biography
Schön was born in Schreitlauken, Tilsit district, East Prussia (now Šereitlaukis, Lithuania). He studied law and political science at the University of Königsberg. In 1793, he entered the Prussian government service and was rapidly promoted, serving as governor. After the Peace of Tilsit, he rendered assistance in carrying out the reforms of Baron vom Stein and Karl August von Hardenberg, and to him is attributed the authorship of the Politisches Testament, which Stein issued upon his retirement from office. In addition, Schön's memorandum on the abolition of serfdom was the basis of the law of emancipation.

In 1816, Schön was appointed governor of West Prussia, and eight years afterwards of the whole Province of Prussia. Under his administration many reforms were made. He was an ardent liberal, and it was partly through his efforts that upon the accession of the new King in 1840 a demand was made for a constitution. Schön was made Minister of State, but his ideas were too advanced for Frederick William IV, and he found it expedient in 1842 to retire from political life. He was buried next to the Arnau Church in East Prussia.

Schön's memoirs and correspondence were published by his son under the title of Aus den Papieren des Ministers und Burggrafen von Marienburg Theodor von Schön (1875–83). The share claimed by him in Stein's reforms has been the subject of some controversy.

Notes

References
 This work in turn cites:
 John Robert Seeley, Life and Times of Stein (Cambridge, 1878)

1773 births
1856 deaths
German politicians of the Napoleonic Wars
Government ministers of Prussia
University of Königsberg alumni
German Freemasons
Member of the Prussian National Assembly
People from East Prussia